Lesbians Who Tech + Allies is a community founded by Leanne Pittsford in 2012 to create a place for queer women and their allies in the field of technology. Its tagline is Queer, Inclusive, Badass. The organization is the largest LGBTQ technology community in the world, with 50,000 LGBTQ women, non-binary people, people of color and allies in tech in over 42 cities worldwide.

History 
The community was started based on a small meet up in the Castro Theatre in San Francisco in December 2012.

By the end of 2013, small events were launched in New York, Seattle, Boston, Los Angeles, London, Berlin and Toronto and the community had nearly 4,000 people. In October 2013, the Lesbians Who Tech + Allies website was launched. The first official Lesbians Who Tech + Allies Summit was held in February 2014 in San Francisco.

In June 2015, Lesbians Who Tech + Allies was awarded a $165,000 grant from the Arrillaga-Andreessen Foundation, starting a nonprofit arm of Lesbians Who Tech + Allies. The grant money was used for two pilot programs; "Bring a Lesbian to Work Day" and a coding scholarship fund.

Lesbians Who Tech + Allies is committed to convening queer women (and allies) in technology in a vibrant and inclusive community. It is not a requirement to identify as lesbian or a member of the LGBTQ community to be part of the organization. The only requirement is to follow the organization's mission and goals; promote the visibility and inclusion of women, LGBT people, and people from other back-grounds under-represented in technology.

Mission 
Lesbians Who Tech + Allies mission is to increase visibility and intersectionality within the technology community. Their mission is to create a culture of inclusion for everyone in order to encourage oneself and others to be influential and make positive changes in their work environment. Lesbians Who Tech + Allies embodies four main goals; (1) to be more visible to each other, (2) to be more visible to others, (3) to get more lesbians and allies into technology, and (4) to connect Lesbians Who Tech + Allies to other LGBTQ and Women's organization who are already doing work for the community. Lesbians Who Tech + Allies aims to build a network of colleagues, associates, and friends in the industry that share the same sexual orientation, in order to help make comfortable connection within the work space. The organization aims to create more visible lesbian leaders that have the ability to serve as public role models. As women are still underrepresented in the technology industry, Lesbians Who Tech + Allies aims to reach out to women, especially lesbians, and encourage their contributions to technology. Additionally, the organization promises to support other groups who are fighting for the same right (women and LGBTQ rights) and raise awareness of their work, while connecting these organization to women in the tech community.

Bring a Lesbian to Work Day 
Participants are matched with mentors in the tech field for a one-day on-site program focused on showing them what it takes to be leaders in whatever field they're interested in. The program's objective is to encourage building professional relationships where people are comfortable with each other.

Edie Windsor Coding Scholarship Fund 
Named after the LGBTQ and technology legend Edie Windsor, the Edie Windsor Coding Scholarship Fund provides opportunity for future generations of LGBTQ, technical women, and non-binary and trans individuals. The scholarship was funded through a Kickstarter campaign, pledging more than $100,000 towards educating 15 women. The bootcamp sponsor, Dev Bootcamp, kicked in another $100,000 in scholarship funds. Lesbians Who Tech + Allies continues the process to raise money in order to provide more queer women with learning opportunities. The more money raised through private and public donors, the more individuals can be educated. The scholarship subsidizes tuition for women and non-binary individuals who need financial assistance to attend coding academies. Through an application process the next round of coding scholars is determined. Each scholar as the chance to choose and apply to the coding school or bootcamp of their choice. In addition to tuition coverage, scholars are also provided with a network of lifelong mentors for support throughout their career.

Summits 
Lesbians Who Tech + Allies hosts annual summits in the Castro district. Summits include networking events with tech companies, keynote speeches, and workshops for attendees.

Noteworthy summits 
The first White House's LGBT Tech and Innovation Summit took place in July 2014 with the aim to explore how technology can be used to end discrimination. Technology and LGBT community leaders were invited to generate answers to some of the major issues the United States is facing, including racial and economic justice, criminal justice reforms, economic inclusion, climate and citizenship. The event had over 150 participants, and was opened by Aditi Hardiker of the White House Office of Public Engagement.

The sixth-annual Lesbians Who Tech + Allies Summit was the largest LGBTQ event in the world. The three day event took place in San Francisco and started on February 28 and lasted till March 2, 2019. The attendees were roughly 80 percent queer women. Of those who spoke on stage, half were women of color, 30 percent were black or Latinx, and 15 percent transgender or gender non-conforming.

Noteworthy speakers 
Black Lives Matter co-founder Alicia Garza, U.S. Senator Tammy Baldwin, former Georgia gubernatorial candidate Stacey Abrams, San Francisco Mayor London Breed, and Emerson Collective founder Laurene Powell Jobs have given speeches at Lesbians Who Tech + Allies Summits. Among many others, further noteworthy speakers include Hillary Clinton, Stacey Abrams, Sheryl Sandberg and Marc Benioff.

References 

2012 establishments in the United States
Lesbian organizations in the United States